Fusarium oxysporum f.sp. asparagi is a fungal plant pathogen infecting asparagus.

References

External links
 USDA ARS Fungal Database

oxysporum f.sp. asparagi
Fungal plant pathogens and diseases
Vegetable diseases
Forma specialis taxa
Fungi described in 1946